Jens Boden (born August 29, 1978 in Dresden) is a German speed skater, who won the bronze medal in the 5000 metres at the 2002 Winter Olympics in Salt Lake City.

External links
Photos of Jens Boden

1978 births
Living people
German male speed skaters
Olympic speed skaters of Germany
Speed skaters at the 2002 Winter Olympics
Speed skaters at the 2006 Winter Olympics
Olympic bronze medalists for Germany
Olympic medalists in speed skating
Medalists at the 2002 Winter Olympics
Sportspeople from Dresden